USS Card (AVG/ ACV/ CVE/ CVHE/ CVU/T-CVU-11/ T-AKV-40) was an American  that saw service in World War II. She was named for Card Sound, a continuation of Biscayne Bay, south of Miami, Florida. She was the flagship of Task Group 21.14 (TG 21.14) a hunter-killer group formed to destroy German submarines in the North Atlantic.

In 1964, while operating as an aircraft ferry, Card was sunk with explosives planted by two Viet Cong commandos in the Harbor of Saigon, South Vietnam. She was refloated 17 days later and returned to service after extensive repairs.

Construction and commissioning
Cards hull was laid down on 27 October 1941, under a Maritime Commission contract, MC hull #178, at Seattle-Tacoma Shipbuilding in Tacoma, Washington, as a Type C3-class ship (cargo type C3-S-A1) and was launched as Hull 178 on 27 February 1942, sponsored by Mrs J. Perry.

She was acquired by the U.S. Navy on 1 May 1942 and redesignated AVG-11 (Aircraft Escort Vessel #11), later reclassified as ACV-11 (Auxiliary Aircraft Carrier 11) on the 20 August 1942 and converted into an escort carrier. She was commissioned on 8 November 1942.

Aircraft carried
Card had capacity for up to 24 fighter and anti-submarine aircraft normally a mixture of Grumman; Wildcat and Avengers with composition dependant upon mission. The squadron had the callsign VC-1 USN (Composite Squadron One).

Service history

World War II
Departing San Diego, California on 18 January 1943, Card arrived at Hampton Roads, Virginia on 1 February for training in the Chesapeake Bay.  Her initial mission began in May 1943 as she escorted slow convoy UGS-8A of troopships and supply vessels to Casablanca in French Morocco.  This convoy shipped six months after the Allied invasion of North Africa and was assembled in preparation for the subsequent invasion of Sicily. With 129 merchant ships and 19 escorts, it was the largest convoy of the war to date.

During this crossing, Card and her escorting destroyers provided daily anti-submarine patrols against U-Boats by air and by sea while remaining close to the convoy.  When escorting the return convoy GUS-8 back to Norfolk, however, Card's orders permitted her to operate more freely against reported concentrations of U-boats as long as she could get back to the convoy in time to protect it.  Thus began the evolution toward totally independent Hunter-Killer Group (HKG) operations

On 15 July Card was reclassified from an Auxiliary Aircraft Carrier (ACV) to an Escort Carrier (CVE).  She became one of the first of fourteen US CVEs around which US anti-submarine HKGs would be centered.  These groups became feasible as increasing numbers of CVEs became available, along with more and better escort ships and aircraft.

They became increasingly effective with the development of improved anti-submarine weapons systems including Mark 24 (FIDO) homing torpedoes and Hedgehog forward-throwing depth charges. Like other US HKGs, those centered around Card operated independently of convoys but, unlike UK HKGs, she operated without centralized control.

These groups used Ultra intelligence from Enigma coded intercepts to locate and destroy U-boats and their replenishment vessels. These intercepts were involved in sinking all 11 submarines sunk by Card'''s HKGs and all but one of the U-boats sunk in the Atlantic Theater by US HKGs during the war.  Card steamed from Norfolk on 27 July as flagship for TG 21.14, an HKG formed for offensive operations against German submarines. This deployment lasted until 10 September.

The Avengers dropped depth charges and an acoustic homing torpedo (codenamed "FIDO") near U-117 and U-66. Two more Avengers and two Wildcats arrived later and forced U-117 to dive before dropping more depth charges and another FIDO. U-117 was hit by one of two acoustic torpedoes and sank with the loss of all hands. U-66 escaped and returned to the boat's homeport, Lorient.

On 8 August 1943  fired three torpedoes at the escort carrier but all missed.  The following day Aircraft from Card sank U-664 in position , west-southwest of Corvo Island, with depth charges from Avengers. Seven crew members were killed and 44 rescued by USS Borie.

Her second deployment was from 25 September to 9 November 1943. Lt. (j.g.) Robert. Coming under heavy anti-aircraft fire from the three U-boats, Lt. Sterns radioed for reinforcements and three more TBM Avengers joined the battle.

The fifth and final sinking of the deployment was on 1 November, by one of Cards escorts.

For her antisubmarine activities from 27 July to 25 October, as part of TG21.14, Card and her task group were awarded the Presidential Unit Citation. Card became the first escort carrier to receive such an award for combating German submarines.Card began her third hunter-killer deployment 24 November 1943 in the North Atlantic. Late on 23 December, the group ran into wolfpack "Borkum"; Card had 12 contacts in 5 hours. Card dodged submarines all night with only Decatur as screen, while Schenck rescued survivors from Leary. The task group returned to Norfolk base on 2 January 1944.

From 18 March to 17 May 1944, Card operated on transport duty between Norfolk and Casablanca. She then underwent overhaul until 4 June, when she steamed for Quonset Point, to hold pilot qualification exercises. She returned to Norfolk, 21 June, to serve as the nucleus of TG 22.10. Thirty survivors, including the mortally wounded commanding officer of the submarine, were taken on board Card and put ashore at Boston, Massachusetts, the next day.

Her next anti-submarine cruise was in the Caribbean, and uneventful, 10 July–23 August 1944. She sortied 18 September as the flagship of TG 22.2 for patrol off the Azores, during which she cooperated with British Escort Group 9 to attack a submarine on 12 October. After another patrol with TG 22.2, 1 December 1944 – 22 January 1945, Card entered Philadelphia Naval Shipyard for overhaul until 7 February.

She then transported Army aircraft and Army and Navy personnel to Liverpool, returning to Norfolk 12 March. From 21 March to 24 May, Card was based on Quonset Point, conducting carrier pilot qualifications. She ferried men and aircraft to Guantanamo Bay, 21–24 June, then transited the Panama Canal, to transport materiel to Pearl Harbor and Guam, returning to San Diego, 14 August.

By the end of World War II, Card's aircraft and escorts destroyed a total of 11 German submarines, making her, along with USS Bogue with 9 German and 2 Japanese submarines, the most successful ships of her class.

Assigned to "Magic Carpet" duty, she made two voyages to Pearl Harbor, and one to the western Pacific, from 21 August to 16 December, returning servicemen to the west coast. Card departed Alameda, California, 7 January 1946, for the east coast where she was placed out of commission in reserve at Norfolk, 13 May.

She was reclassified as a helicopter escort carrier CVHE-11, 12 June 1955; a utility carrier CVU-11, 1 July 1958; and an aviation transport AKV-40, 7 May 1959.

Awards
In addition to her Presidential Unit Citation, Card received three battle stars for service in World War II.

Vietnam War

The ship was reactivated on 16 May 1958, as USNS Card and operated with a civilian crew under Military Sea Transportation Service (MSTS) control as an aircraft transport. On 15 December 1961, Card left Quonset Point Naval Air Station in Rhode Island, with a cargo of H-21 Shawnee helicopters and soldiers from Fort Devens, bound for Vietnam. At Subic Bay, in the Philippines, the cargo and troops were transferred to the helicopter carrier , which arrived and unloaded off the coast of Da Nang, on 25 January 1962.

On 2 May 1964, while Card was moored dockside in Saigon, a Viet Cong frogman planted an explosive charge that blew a hole in the hull, killing five crewmen. She was patched and pumped out, and raised on 19 May, and towed to Subic Bay, and then Yokosuka, for repairs. Card returned to service on 11 December.

During the latter part of 1967, and early part of 1968, Card brought US military helicopters to the Republic of South Vietnam. These helicopters were assembled on board the ship by members of the 388th Transportation Company, 765th Transportation Battalion, and then flown to the US Army airfield at Vũng Tàu. From there the helicopters were assigned to aviation units.

FateCard'' entered the Pacific Reserve Fleet, at Olympia, Washington, on 10 March 1970, was sold for scrapping to Zidell Explorations, Inc for $93,899.99, on 14 May 1971 and withdrawn from the fleet on 9 June 1971.

Awards
 Presidential Unit Citation
 American Campaign Medal with one battle star
 European-African-Middle Eastern Campaign Medal with two battle stars
 World War II Victory Medal
 Navy Occupation Medal with "ASIA" clasp
 National Defense Service Medal
 Armed Forces Expeditionary Medal
 Vietnam Service Medal with one campaign star
 Republic of Vietnam Campaign Medal

Citations

Bibliography

External links

 USS Card at NHHC/DANFS
 USS Card at World War II Database
 USS Card at U-boat.net
 USS Card Association
 NavSource Online
 VietNamNet Bridge

 

Bogue-class escort carriers of the United States Navy
Ships built in Tacoma, Washington
1942 ships
World War II escort aircraft carriers of the United States
Cold War auxiliary ships of the United States
Vietnam War auxiliary ships of the United States
Maritime incidents in 1964